Ghost Ensemble is a New York-based experimental new music ensemble composed of flute, oboe, accordion, percussion, harp, viola, cello, two contrabasses, and conductor. Frequently commissioning new repertoire that merges classically notated music and improvisation, the ensemble follows an aesthetic that has been described as "music composed for a deep listening that fixes you in the present" that "uses sound to seek an altered consciousness, from a meditative awareness to a look, perhaps, into a different dimension". The ensemble is also closely connected to the music of Pauline Oliveros, who introduced several members of the ensemble before its inception. 
The group frequently performs the work of Oliveros and advocates for her philosophy of Deep Listening. Ghost Ensemble's 2018 debut LP features work by Oliveros, ensemble director Ben Richter, and founding oboist Sky Macklay; 2021 release Mountain Air features the Oliveros work of the same name and works by Marguerite Brown and Teodora Stepancic. Other composers commissioned by the ensemble include ensemble bassist James Ilgenfritz, Liisa Hirsch, Elizabeth Adams, Kristina Wolfe, Andrew C. Smith, and Kyle Gann. Performance collaborators have included Carmina Escobar and David Rothenberg. Ghost Ensemble performs nationally at venues such as REDCAT in Los Angeles and Pioneer Works in New York.

Discography
Mountain Air - CD (Indexical, September 2021)
We Who Walk Again - LP (Indexical, May 2018)
Lightbulb Ensemble & Ghost Ensemble Live at Pioneer Works (Indexical, 2015)

References

External links 
 Official web site
 Ghost Ensemble page at Indexical site
 Bandcamp Daily: The Best Contemporary Classical Albums of 2018

Contemporary classical music ensembles
American instrumental musical groups
Musical groups established in 2012
Musical groups from New York City
2012 establishments in New York City